Chakkarakadavu is a small village to the east of the town of Cherai, on Vypin Island in Ernakulam district, Kerala, India.

Chakkarakadavu shares a common history with Cherai and with the greater Vypin Island. It is the birthplace of Mathai Manjooran, an Indian independence activist from Kerala and  the staunchest proponent for the formation of the Kerala State.

References

Villages in Ernakulam district